Brian Keller (born June 21, 1994) is an American professional baseball pitcher for the Hanshin Tigers of Nippon Professional Baseball.

Career
Keller attended Germantown High School in Germantown, Wisconsin, and the University of Wisconsin-Milwaukee. He played college baseball for the Milwaukee Panthers.

The New York Yankees selected Keller in the 39th round of the 2016 MLB draft. He received a $2,000 signing bonus when he signed with the Yankees. While pitching for the Trenton Thunder of the Class AA Eastern League, he was named the league's pitcher of the week for July 23–29. On August 1, 2019, Keller threw a seven-inning no-hitter for Trenton.

After the 2021 season, the Boston Red Sox selected Keller from the Yankees in the minor league phase of the Rule 5 draft. Keller signed with the Hanshin Tigers of Nippon Professional Baseball after the 2022 season.

See also
Rule 5 draft results

References

External links

Living people
1994 births
People from Germantown, Wisconsin
Baseball players from Wisconsin
Baseball pitchers
Milwaukee Panthers baseball players
La Crosse Loggers players
Lakeshore Chinooks players
Gulf Coast Yankees players
Pulaski Yankees players
Staten Island Yankees players
Charleston RiverDogs players
Tampa Yankees players
Trenton Thunder players
Scranton/Wilkes-Barre RailRiders players
Worcester Red Sox players